Diphenol may refer to:

 Benzenediols
 Bisphenols
 Dihydroxybiphenyls
 Certain polyphenols (those with 2 phenolic groups)